Aiolosite (IMA symbol: Aio) is a rare sodium bismuth sulfate mineral with the chemical formula NaBi(SO)Cl. Its type locality is Vulcano, Sicily, Italy. Its name comes from the Greek name Aeolus.

References

External links 

 Aiolosite data sheet

Sodium minerals
Bismuth minerals
Sulfate minerals
Chlorides